The Fernando Formation is a Plio-Pleistocene marine mudstone, siltstone and sandstone formation in the greater Los Angeles Basin, Ventura Basin, and Santa Monica Mountains, in Los Angeles County of Southern California.

Geology 
Outcrops of the formation in Santa Monica Mountains National Recreation Area have produced fossil shark teeth.

Classification 
The underlying Repetto Formation is equivalent in age to the Fernando Formation, and some researchers consider it as well as the overlying Pico Formation to be a junior synonym based on benthic foraminifera stages. Other researchers maintain that the Repetto and Pico Formations are distinct stratigraphic units, and that the use of the name "Fernando Formation" should be stopped due to several issues with stratigraphic correlation and access to the type section.

See also

References 

Geologic formations of California
Fossiliferous stratigraphic units of the United States
Paleontology in California
Pliocene California
Pleistocene California
Sandstone formations of the United States
Siltstone formations
Mudstone formations
Geology of Los Angeles County, California
Natural history of the Santa Monica Mountains